Catherine Mathieson (11 December 1818 – 14 September 1883) was a New Zealand cheese and butter maker, community leader. She was born in Lochmaben, Dumfriesshire, Scotland on 11 December 1818.

See also

 List of cheesemakers

References

1818 births
1883 deaths
Scottish emigrants to New Zealand
Cheesemakers
19th-century New Zealand businesspeople
19th-century New Zealand businesswomen